Rachel Amanda Harris (born 15 March 1979) is an Australian freestyle and medley swimmer who competed for her native country at the 2000 Summer Olympics in Sydney, Australia.  There she finished in twelfth position in the women's 800-metre freestyle, and twelfth in the 400-metre individual medley. She now works as a specialist Sport & Exercise Medicine physician.

Harris won the gold medal in the 800-metre freestyle at the 1998 Commonwealth Games in Kuala Lumpur, Malaysia. She was also the winner of the silver medal in the 800m Freestyle at the World Short Course Swimming Championships in Hong Kong in 1999.

In 2003 Harris began studying at the University of Western Australia and graduated with a Bachelor of Medicine, Bachelor of Surgery 2008. Since graduation she has completed a Diploma of Child Health (2012, PMH, WA) and IOC Diploma of Sports Medicine (2015, International Olympic Committee).. She is a sports medicine specialist and Fellow of the Australasian College of Sport and Exercise Physicians.

Harris is the Chief Medical Officer for Water Polo Australia and is based in Perth, WA.

References

1979 births
Australian female freestyle swimmers
Australian female medley swimmers
Olympic swimmers of Australia
Swimmers at the 1998 Commonwealth Games
Swimmers at the 2000 Summer Olympics
Sportswomen from Western Australia
Commonwealth Games gold medallists for Australia
Living people
Medalists at the FINA World Swimming Championships (25 m)
Swimmers from Perth, Western Australia
Commonwealth Games medallists in swimming
Australian sports physicians
20th-century Australian women
Medallists at the 1998 Commonwealth Games